Presidential elections were held in the Republic of New Granada in 1833. Francisco de Paula Santander was re-elected President, whilst Joaquín Mosquera was elected Vice President.

Background
Following the promulgation of the new constitution, Francisco de Paula Santander was elected interim President by the Constituent Assembly on 9 March 1832, to serve until the first official presidential term began on 1 April 1833.

The electoral college was elected later in 1832.

Results

President

Vice President

References

Colombia
Presidential elections in Colombia
President